Egmont Cycling Race is a single-day road bicycle race held annually in August in Zottegem, Belgium. Since 2005, the race is organized as a 1.1 event on the UCI Europe Tour.

The race started out as 'Dokter Tistaertprijs' in 1934. Between 1971 and 1998 it was called 'Herinneringsprijs Dokter Tistaert – Prijs Groot-Zottegem'. In 1999 it changed to 'G.P. Zottegem – Tistaertprijs'. In 2002 'Tistaertprijs' disappeared in the name. It was called GP Stad Zottegem until 2020. since 2020 the organization continued under the name 'Egmont Cycling Race'.

Winners

External links
 Official Website

Recurring sporting events established in 1934
1934 establishments in Belgium
UCI Europe Tour races
Cycle races in Belgium
Sport in East Flanders